Milton Cooper Work (September 15, 1864 – June 27, 1934) was an American authority on whist, bridge whist, auction and contract bridge. At least during the 19th century he was a cricket player, writer, and official.

Work, Sidney Lenz, and Oswald Jacoby were named to its bridge hall of fame by The Bridge World monthly magazine in 1965, which brought the number of members to six. They were all made founding members of the ACBL Hall of Fame in 1995.

Life

Work was born in Philadelphia, Pennsylvania, where he graduated from the University of Pennsylvania and practiced law from 1887 to 1917. He and Wilbur C. Whitehead toured the country in 1917 "organizing bridge competitions and lecturing on bridge, to promote the sale of Liberty bonds". The tour was successful enough that he made bridge a full-time occupation rather than return to law.

Other sporting activities 

Work was the manager of the Philadelphian cricket team that toured England in 1897. He had earlier played for Belmont Cricket Club between at least 1880 and 1887. He also played cricket, tennis and baseball for the University of Pennsylvania in 1887. He edited the American Cricketer magazine.

In 1897 he was a representative of the Belmont Golf Association at a meeting which founded the Golf Association of Philadelphia.

Work Point Count system 

In his writings on bridge during the last seven years of his life, Work adopted Bryant McCampbell's 1915 suggestion for evaluating balanced hands using a point count method: Ace = 4, King = 3, Queen = 2 and Jack = 1.  Although Work had strongly opposed point count methods for 25 years (1902-1927), beginning about 1927 he became a strong advocate of the 4-3-2-1-½ point count—so much so that it became known as the Work Point Count. Subsequently, his employee and disciple Charles Goren adapted it to value all hands. It is still used by players today. In 1927 Work was named American Bridge League (ABL) Honorary Member of the Year.

Selected works 

 Whist of Today: in two parts, 2nd ed.[?] (Philadelphia: Dreka, 1895), 182 pp. 
 "Also available in digital form on the Internet Archive Web site." 
 Auction of To-day, 5th ed.[?] (Houghton-Mifflin Co., 1913), 299 pp. 
 Auction Under the Laws of 1915 (Philadelphia: John C. Winston Co., 1915), 104 pp.
 Auction Declarations (Winston, 1917), 288 pp.
 Auction Methods Up-to-Date including the new laws of 1920 (Winston, 1920), 332 pp.
 Auction for Two or Three, with a new code of laws for these games (Winston, 1921), 222  pp. – with "appendix giving improved methods for two-handed Canfield and Russian Bank" 
 Par Auction, analysis of play (Milton Bradley Company, 1921), 59 pp. 
 Auction Bridge in Twelve Lessons (Milton Bradley, 1922), 270 pp. 
 Auction Bridge of 1924 (Winston, 1923), 507 pp.
 Mah-jongg ... Up-to-Date (Winston, 1924), 177 pp. – Mahjong
 Auction Bridge Complete (Winston, 1926), 500 pp.  
 Bridge Pointers and Tests (Winston, 1927), 192 pp.
 Contract Bridge (Winston, 1927) 143 pp. – "including the official laws of contract bridge adopted by the Whist club, New York and by the Racquet and Tennis club, New York" 
 Auction Bridge for Beginners (Winston, 1928), 136 pp.
 Contract Bridge For All (Winston, 1929), 243 pp.
 Lesson hands for use of bridge teachers of the common sense system (Winston, 1930), 25 pp. 
 Common Sense Contract Bridge (Winston, 1931), 369 pp. 
 The Gist of Contract Bridge (Winston, 1931), 56 pp. 
 The official system of contract bridge in a nutshell (Winston, 1931), 58 pp. 
 Milton C. Work's short-cut to contract official system (A. G. Spalding Bros., 1931), 183 pp. 
 The official summary of the new standardized official system of contract bridge (Winston, 1933), 83 pp. 
 One hundred and one celebrated hands in contract bridge, bid and played, eds. Work and Olive Avery Peterson (Winston, 1933), 215 pp. 
 The Work–Peterson accurate valuation system of contract bridge, Work and Peterson (Winston, 1934), 101 pp. 

Periodicals

 Auction Bridge and Mah Jong Magazine, eds. Work and Wilbur C. Whitehead (NY: John H. Smith Pub, 1924) 
 Auction Bridge Magazine, Work and Whitehead (J. H. Smith, 1924–1929)

Notes

References

Sources 
Cricket profile
Wisden Cricketer's Almanack, 1935 edition, Obituaries section

External links
 
  – linked variously as by Milton C.; Milton Cooper; Milton Cooper, 1864–1934; Milton Cooper, 1864– (including 19 "from old catalog") 
 
 

1864 births
1934 deaths
American contract bridge players
Contract bridge writers
Philadelphian cricketers
University of Pennsylvania alumni
American lawyers
Cricketers from Philadelphia
Place of death missing